Anneli Pirjo Marjukka Aejmelaeus (née Halonen, b.) (September 18, 1948 in Mikkeli) is professor emerita of Old Testament and Ancient Near Eastern Culture and Literature in the Faculty of Theology at the University of Helsinki, and is the vice-director of the Academy of Finland Centre of Excellence "Changes in Sacred Texts and Traditions". Before this, she held from 1991 to 2009 the position of Professor of Old Testament and Septuagint Research in the Faculty of Theology at the University of Göttingen. In addition, from 1993 to 2000, Aejmelaeus was the Director of the research institute "Septuaginta-Unternehmen" at the Göttingen Academy of Sciences and Humanities.

Books 
 Parataxis in the Septuagint: a study of the renderings of the Hebrew coordinate clauses in the Greek Pentateuch. Helsinki: Suomen Tiedeakatemia..
 On the trail of the Septuagint translators: collected essays. Leuven: Peeters, 2007..
 Täyttä hepreaa: johdatus Vanhan testamentin hepreaan. Helsinki: Kirjapaja, 2007..

References 

1948 births
Living people
Academic staff of the University of Helsinki
Finnish expatriates in Germany
Finnish theologians